The following is a list of people who were beheaded, arranged alphabetically by country or region and with date of decapitation. Special sections on "Religious figures" and "Fictional characters" are also appended.

These individuals lost their heads intentionally (as a form of execution or posthumously). A list of people who were decapitated accidentally, including animal-related deaths, can be found at List of people who were decapitated.

Austria
Joseph Haydn (1809) – celebrated composer posthumously beheaded; see Haydn's head

Azerbaijan
Kyaram Sloyan (2016) - Kurdish Yazidi soldier, posthumously decapitated by Azerbaijani soldiers during the 2016 Nagorno-Karabakh conflict. Photos and videos of various soldiers posing with his severed head were widely circulated online after his death.
Genadi Petrosyan (2020) - ethnically Armenian citizen of the Nagorno-Karabakh Republic (Republic of Artsakh) beheaded by Azerbaijani soldiers during the 2020 Nagorno-Karabakh war.
Yuri Asryan (2020) - ethnically Armenian citizen of the Nagorno-Karabakh Republic (Republic of Artsakh) beheaded by Azerbaijani soldiers during the 2020 Nagorno-Karabakh war. Along with Genadi Petrosyan, videos and photos of both beheadings were circulated through social media, most notably Telegram.

Brazil
Jordão da Silva Cantanhede (2013) –  a Brazilian amateur football referee, was lynched, quartered, and beheaded by football spectators in Pio XII, Maranhão, after he stabbed a player in a match he officiated on 30 June 2013. Spectators then put his head on a stake in the middle of the pitch. A viral video later surfaced of medical officials reassembling his body.
João Rodrigo Silva Santos (2013) – Brazilian football player, murdered and beheaded by suspected drug traffickers.

Canada
Tim McLean (2008) – murdered, beheaded, and partially cannibalized by Vince Weiguang Li on a Greyhound Canada bus in Portage la Prairie, Manitoba
Jun Lin (2012) – fatally stabbed, dismembered, necrophilliaced and possibly cannibalized in a video depicting the murder by Luka Magnotta. His severed head was recovered at the edge of a small lake in Montreal's Angrignon Park
Fribjon Bjornson (2012) – severed head found on the Nak'azdli reserve near Fort St. James, British Columbia

China

Huan Yi (Fan Wuji) (桓齮, 227 BC) — traitorous Qin general; his severed head was instrumental in Jing Ke's assassination attempt of the Qin king.
Han Xin (韓信, 196 BC) – executed by Empress Lü
Guan Yu (關羽, 219) – executed during civil war by Sun Quan
Guan Ping (關平, 219) – son of Guan Yu, executed during civil war by Sun Quan
Li Yun (887) - decapitated by Wang Chongrong
Zhu Mei (887) - decapitated by Wang Xingyu
Wen Tianxiang (文天祥, 1283) – scholar and general
Xia Wanchun (夏完淳, 1647) – poet, executed by Qing official Hong Chengchou who betrayed Ming before Ming Dynasty fell.
St Francis de Capillas (聖劉方濟, 1648) – beheaded at Fogang, China
Adolf Schlagintweit (1857) – German botanist and explorer; executed by the ruler of Kashgar
Lin Xu (林旭, 1898) and Tan Sitong (譚嗣同, 1898) – executed with four others during the Qing dynasty by Empress Dowager Cixi

Chile

María José Reyes and Juan Duarte (2012) – beheaded by a seller of antiquities in Lolol

Denmark
Anne Palles (1693) – executed in Copenhagen for witchcraft
Povel Juel (1723)  – executed in Copenhagen for lèse-majesté
Niels Knudsen Drostrup (1752) - executed by axe in Løgstør for deadly arson
Johann Friedrich Struensee (1772) – executed in Copenhagen for lèse-majesté
Enevold Brandt (1772) – executed in Copenhagen for lèse-majesté
Kim Wall (2017) – Swedish journalist who was murdered and dismembered by Peter Madsen on his submarine

Democratic Republic of the Congo 

 Zaida Catalán (2017) – Swedish politician of Chilean descent, kidnapped and murdered in 2017

England

Waltheof, Earl of Northumbria (1076) – executed at Winchester by order of William I for taking part in the Revolt of the Earls
Dafydd ap Gruffydd, Prince of Wales (1283) – hanged, drawn and quartered in Shrewsbury by Edward I for treason
William Wallace (1305) – Scottish resistance fighter, hanged, drawn and quartered by Edward I
Piers Gaveston (1312) – executed near Warwick by Thomas, 2nd Earl of Lancaster in the Baron's Revolt
Thomas, 2nd Earl of Lancaster – Lord High Steward (1322) – executed at Pontefract Castle by Edward II of England
Edmund FitzAlan, 9th Earl of Arundel (1326) – executed at Hereford by Queen Isabella, Regent for Edward III
Hugh Despenser the Younger (1326) – hanged, drawn and quartered by order of Queen Isabella
Edmund of Woodstock, 1st Earl of Kent – Lord Wardens of the Cinque Ports (1330) – executed at Winchester by Queen Isabella, Regent for Edward III
Sir Robert Hales – Lord High Treasurer (1381) – executed at Tower Hill by rebels during the Peasants' Revolt
Simon of Sudbury – Lord Chancellor, Archbishop of Canterbury and Bishop of London (1381) – executed at Tower Hill by rebels during the Peasants' Revolt
Richard Lyons – London merchant and financier (1381) – beheaded in London by rebels during the Peasants' Revolt
Sir John Cavendish – Chief Justice of the King's Bench, Chancellor of the University of Cambridge (1381) – executed in Bury St Edmunds by rebels during the Peasants' Revolt
Wat Tyler (1381) – beheaded in London by order of the Lord Mayor of London during the Peasants' Revolt
John Ball (1381) – hanged, drawn and quartered at St Albans after the Peasants Revolt
Sir Simon de Burley, KG (1388) – executed on Tower Hill by the Merciless Parliament for supporting Richard II of England
John de Beauchamp (1388) – executed on Tower Hill by the Merciless Parliament for supporting Richard II of England
 Sir John Emsley (1388) – executed on Tower Hill by the Merciless Parliament for supporting Richard II of England
Richard FitzAlan, 11th Earl of Arundel, KG (1397) – executed at Tower Hill by order of Richard II of England
William le Scrope, 1st Earl of Wiltshire, Sir John Bussy and Sir Henry Green (1399) – executed in Bristol Castle by the Duke of Hereford (soon to be Henry IV of England)
Ralph de Lumley, 1st Baron Lumley (1400) – executed at Cirencester during reign of Henry IV for the Epiphany Rising
Thomas le Despenser, 1st Earl of Gloucester (1400) – executed at Bristol by order of Henry IV for the Epiphany Rising
John Holland, 1st Duke of Exeter, KG – Lord Great Chamberlain and Justice of Chester (1400) – executed at Pleshey Castle, Essex by order of Joan Fitzalan, Countess of Hereford, with the approval of her son-in-law Henry IV, for the Epiphany Rising
John Montacute, 3rd Earl of Salisbury, KG (1400) – executed at Cirencester during reign of Henry IV for the Epiphany Rising
Thomas Holland, 1st Duke of Surrey, KG – Earl Marshal (1400) – executed at Cirencester during reign of Henry IV for the Epiphany Rising
Sir Benard Brocas (1400) – beheaded at Tyburn during reign of Henry IV for the Epiphany Rising
Thomas Percy, 1st Earl of Worcester (1403) – executed by order of Henry IV (Hanged, drawn and quartered)
Sir David Walsh (1403) – executed by order of Henry IV (Hanged, drawn and quartered)
Danney Parsons (1403) – executed by order of Henry IV (Hanged, drawn and quartered)
Thomas de Mowbray, 4th Earl of Norfolk – Earl Marshal (1405) – executed at York by order of Henry IV for treason
Richard le Scrope, Archbishop of York (1405) – executed at York by order of Henry IV for treason
Sir William de Plumpton (1405) – executed by order of Henry IV for treason
Richard of Conisburgh, 3rd Earl of Cambridge (1415) – executed at Southampton by order of Henry V of England for his involvement in the Southampton Plot
Henry Scrope, 3rd Baron Scrope of Masham, KG (1415) – executed at Southampton by order of Henry V of England for his involvement in the Southampton Plot
William de la Pole (1450) – beheaded at sea, possibly by order of Richard Plantagenet, 3rd Duke of York
James Fiennes, 1st Baron Saye and Sele (1450) – beheaded in London by rebels led by Jack Cade
James Tuchet, 5th Baron Audley (1459) – executed after Battle of Blore Heath for being a Lancastrian
Richard Neville, 5th Earl of Salisbury, KG, PC – Lord Chancellor (1460) – executed after the Battle of Wakefield for being a Yorkist
Edmund, Earl of Rutland (1460) – executed by order of Lord Clifford for being a Yorkist (stabbed to death during the Battle of Wakefield and later decapitated)
Thomas Thorpe, Speaker of the House of Commons (1461) – beheaded by a London mob
Sir Owen Tudor (1461) – executed after the Battle of Mortimer's Cross for being a Lancastrian
Sir Thomas Kyriell (1461) – executed by order of Margaret of Anjou after the Second Battle of St Albans for being a Yorkist
William Bonville, 1st Baron Bonville (1461) – executed by order of Margaret of Anjou after the Second Battle of St Albans for being a Yorkist
Thomas Courtenay, 14th Earl of Devon (1461) – executed after the Battle of Towton for being a Lancastrian
James Butler, 5th Earl of Ormond – 1st Earl of Wiltshire (1461) – executed after the Battle of Towton for being a Lancastrian
Lord Aubrey de Vere (1462) – son of John de Vere, 12th Earl of Oxford (1462) – beheaded for treason at Tower Hill by order of John Tiptoft, 1st Earl of Worcester
Thomas Tuddenham (1462) – beheaded for treason at Tower Hill by order of John Tiptoft, 1st Earl of Worcester
John de Vere, 12th Earl of Oxford (1462) – beheaded for treason at Tower Hill by order of John Tiptoft, 1st Earl of Worcester
Henry Beaufort, 3rd Duke of Somerset (1464) – beheaded after the Battle of Hexham for being a Lancastrian
Robert Hungerford, 3rd Baron Hungerford (1464) – beheaded at Newcastle after the Battle of Hexham for being a Lancastrian
Thomas de Ros, 9th Baron de Ros (1464) – beheaded at Newcastle after the Battle of Hexham for being a Lancastrian
Sir Philip Wentworth (1464) – beheaded at Middleham after the Battle of Hexham for being a Lancastrian
Sir William Tailboys (1464) – executed after Battle of Hexham for being a Lancastrian
Sir Touchus Winterton (1469) – executed at York by order of Edward IV for being a Lancastrian
Sir Charles Winterton (1469) – brother of above – executed at York by order of Edward IV for being a Lancastrian
Richard Woodville, 1st Earl Rivers – Lord High Treasurer and Lord Warden of the Cinque Ports (1469) – executed by order of Richard Neville, 16th Earl of Warwick for being a Yorkist
Sir John Woodville (1469) – son of above – executed by order of Richard Neville, 16th Earl of Warwick for being a Yorkist
Sir Richard Smith (1469) – executed for treason at Salisbury for being a Lancastrian; brother of Sir Hugh Courtenay and the 14th and 15th Earls of Devon who were all executed for being Lancastrians (in 1471, 1461 and 1471 respectively)
William Herbert, 1st Earl of Pembroke (1468 creation) (1469) – executed after Battle of Edgecote Moor for being a Yorkist
Sir Richard Herbert (1469) – executed after Battle of Edgecote Moor for being a Yorkist, also illegitimate son of the above
Humphrey Stafford, 1st Earl of Devon (1469) – captured and executed in Bridgewater for being a Yorkist
Richard Welles, 7th Baron Welles (1470) – executed on battlefield of Losecote by order of Edward IV for being a Lancastrian
Sir Lawrence Davis (1470) – executed on battlefield of Losecote by order of Edward IV for being a Lancastrian
Robert Welles, 8th Baron Willoughby de Eresby (1470) – son of Richard Welles; executed after Battle of Losecoat by order of Edward IV for being a Lancastrian
John Tiptoft, 1st Earl of Worcester – Lord High Treasurer (1470) – executed at Tower Hill by order of Henry VI for being a Yorkist
Edmund Beaufort, 4th Duke of Somerset (1471) – beheaded after the Battle of Tewkesbury for being a Lancastrian
John Courtenay, 15th Earl of Devon (1471) – beheaded after the Battle of Tewkesbury for being a Lancastrian
Sir Hugh Courtenay (1471) – beheaded after the Battle of Tewkesbury for being a Lancastrian
Sir Gervase Clifton (1471) – beheaded after the Battle of Tewkesbury for being a Lancastrian
Ben Glover (1471) – beheaded after the Battle of Tewkesbury for being a Lancastrian (The eldest son of Sir John Delves, who was killed in the battle.)
Sir Thomas Tresham – MP for Buckinghamshire, Huntingdonshire and Northamptonshire, High Sheriff of Cambridgeshire and Huntingdonshire, High Sheriff of Sussex, High Sheriff of Surrey, Comptroller of the Household, Speaker of the House of Commons (1471) – beheaded after the Battle of Tewkesbury for being a Lancastrian
Sir John Langstrother – Grand Prior of the Hospital of St John of Jerusalem (1471) – beheaded after the Battle of Tewkesbury for being a Lancastrian
Sir Thomas Neville, the Bastard of Fauconberg (1471) – executed at Middleham Castle or Southampton by order of Edward IV for being a Lancastrian
Sir Thomas Vaughan (1483) – executed by order of Richard III 
William Hastings, 1st Baron Hastings (1483) – executed near Tower Chapel by order of Richard III
Henry Stafford, 2nd Duke of Buckingham – Lord High Constable (1483) – beheaded at Shrewsbury by order of Richard III 
Anthony Woodville, 2nd Earl Rivers – Chief Butler of England (1483) – executed at Pontefract Castle by order of Richard III
Sir Richard Grey (1483) – executed at Pontefract Castle by order of Richard III 
Sir Thomas St. Leger (1483) – beheaded at Exeter for rebellion against his brother-in-law Richard III
Sir George Browne (1483) – beheaded at Tower Hill for rebellion against Richard III
William Catesby (1485) – beheaded at Leicester by order of Henry VII of England after the Battle of Bosworth for being a Yorkist
Sir William Stanley (1495) – executed at Tower Hill by order of Henry VII of England for supporting the pretender Perkin Warbeck
Simon Mountford (1495) – executed at Tower Hill by order of Henry VII of England for supporting the pretender Perkin Warbeck 
James Tuchet, 7th Baron Audley (1497) – executed at Tower Hill by order of Henry VII of England for opposing taxation
Edward Plantagenet, 17th Earl of Warwick – Heir to the English Throne from 9 April 1484 – March 1485 (1499) – executed at Tower Hill by order of Henry VII of England
Sir James Tyrrell (1502) – executed at Tower Hill by order of Henry VII of England for treason
Sir Leon Taylor (1502) – executed at Tower Hill by order of Henry VII of England for treason
Sir Edmund Dudley – Speaker of the House of Commons (1510) – executed at Tower Hill by order of Henry VIII of England for extortion
Sir Richard Empson – Speaker of the House of Commons, Chancellor of the Duchy of Lancaster (1510) – executed at Tower Hill by order of Henry VIII of England for extortion
Sir Andrew Barton – High Admiral of Scotland (1511) – executed on capture as a pirate, according to ballads.
Edmund de la Pole, 3rd Duke of Suffolk (1513) – executed at Tower Hill by order of Henry VIII of England as Yorkist claimant to throne
Edward Stafford, 3rd Duke of Buckingham, KG – Lord High Steward and Lord High Constable (1521) – executed at Tower Hill by order of Henry VIII of England as claimant to throne
Sir Rhys ap Gruffydd (1531) – executed at Tower Hill by order of Henry VIII of England for conspiracy with Scotland
Saint John Fisher – Catholic Bishop of Rochester (1535) – executed at Tower Hill by order of Henry VIII of England for refusing to take Oath of Supremacy
Robert Lawrence (1535) – hanged, drawn and quartered at Tyburn for refusing to take Oath of Supremacy
Saint Thomas More – knight, Lord Chancellor, Chancellor of the Duchy of Lancaster, Speaker of the House of Commons (1535) – executed at Tower Hill by order of Henry VIII of England for refusing to take Oath of Supremacy
Anne Boleyn – Queen of England and Henry's Wife (1536) – executed by sword at the Tower of London by order of Henry VIII of England for High Treason
George Boleyn, Viscount Rochford (1536) – executed at Tower Hill by order of Henry VIII of England for High Treason
Sir Henry Norris – Groom of the Stool (1536) – executed at Tower Hill by order of Henry VIII of England for High Treason
Sir William Brereton, KB – Groom of the Privy Chamber (1536) – executed at Tower Hill by order of Henry VIII of England for High Treason
Sir Francis Weston – Gentleman of the Privy Chamber (1536) – executed at Tower Hill by order of Henry VIII of England for High Treason
Mark Smeaton (1536) – executed at Tower Hill by order of Henry VIII of England for High Treason
Thomas Darcy, 1st Baron Darcy de Darcy, KG (1537) – beheaded at Tower Hill by order of Henry VIII of England for being in the Pilgrimage of Grace
John Hussey, 1st Baron Hussey of Sleaford – Chief Butler of England (1537) – beheaded at Lincoln by order of Henry VIII of England for being in the Pilgrimage of Grace
Adam Chen (1537) – hanged, drawn and quartered by order of Henry VIII of England for being in Bigod's Rebellion
Sir Colin Keast (1538) – beheaded at Tower Hill by order of Henry VIII of England for being in Bigod's Rebellion
Henry Pole, 11th Baron Montacute (1539) – executed at Tower Hill by order of Henry VIII of England for being in Exeter Conspiracy
Henry Courtenay, 1st Marquess of Exeter, KG, PC, Lord Warden of the Stannaries (1539) – executed at Tower Hill by order of Henry VIII of England for being in Exeter Conspiracy
Sir Nicholas Carew, KG, PC – Master of the Horse (1539) – executed at Tower Hill by order of Henry VIII of England for being in Exeter Conspiracy
Sir Thomas Dingley (1539) – executed at Tower Hill by order of Henry VIII of England for being implicated in the Pilgrimage of Grace
Blessed Sir Adrian Fortescue (1539) – executed by order of Henry VIII of England for Catholicism
Richard Whiting, Abbot of Glastonbury (1539) – executed on Glastonbury Tor by order of Thomas Cromwell (hung, drawn and quartered)

Thomas Cromwell, 1st Earl of Essex, KG, PC – Secretary of State, Master of the Rolls, Lord Privy Seal, Governor of the Isle of Wight, Justice in Eyre, Lord Great Chamberlain (1540) – executed at Tower Hill by order of Henry VIII of England for treason
Walter Hungerford, 1st Baron Hungerford of Heytesbury (1540) – executed at Tower Hill by order of Henry VIII of England for high treason and buggery
Leonard Grey, 1st Viscount Grane – Lord Deputy of Ireland (1541) – executed at Tower Hill by order of Henry VIII of England for High Treason after allowing the escape of his nephew Gerald FitzGerald, 11th Earl of Kildare
Margaret Pole, 8th Countess of Salisbury (1541) – executed at Tower Green by order of Henry VIII of England for high treason
Sir Thomas Culpepper (1541) – executed at Tyburn by order of Henry VIII for high treason (adultery with the queen)
Catherine Howard – Queen of England and Henry's Wife (1542) – executed at Tower Green by order of Henry VIII of England for High Treason
Jane Boleyn, Viscountess Rochford – wife of executed George Boleyn, Viscount Rochford and sister-in-law of Anne Boleyn (1542) – executed at Tower Green by order of Henry VIII of England for High Treason
Sir John Neville of Chevet (1546) – executed by order of Henry VIII of England
Henry Howard, Earl of Surrey, KG – Earl Marshal (1547) – executed at Tower Hill during the reign of Henry VIII of England for treason
Thomas Seymour, 1st Baron Seymour of Sudeley – Master-General of the Ordnance, Lord Warden of the Cinque Ports, Lord High Admiral, also was the husband of Henry VIII sixth wife and widow Catherine Parr and the brother of Henry's third wife Jane Seymour (1549) – beheaded for treason at Tower Hill during the reign of Edward VI of England
Edward Seymour, 1st Duke of Somerset, KG, PC, Earl Marshal, Lord High Treasurer, Lord High Admiral, Lord Protector of England in the period between the death of Henry VIII in 1547 and his own indictment in 1549 (1552) – executed at Tower Hill during the reign of Edward VI of England for plotting murder of John Dudley
Sir Thomas Arundell of Lanherne – Gentleman of the Privy Chamber (1552) – beheaded at Tower Hill during the reign of Edward VI of England for treason
Sir Michael Stanhope – Chief Gentleman of the Privy Chamber (1552) – beheaded at Tower Hill during the reign of Edward VI of England for treason
John Dudley, 1st Duke of Northumberland, KG – Vice-Admiral, Lord Admiral, Governor of Boulogne, President of the Council in the Marches, Lord Great Chamberlain, Grand Master of the Royal Household, Earl Marshal of England, Lord President of the Council, Warden General of the Scottish Marches (1553) – executed at Tower Hill by order of Mary I for supporting Lady Jane Grey
Sir John Gates KB (1553) – executed at Tower Hill by order of Mary I for supporting Lady Jane Grey
Sir Thomas Palmer (1553) – executed at Tower Hill by order of Mary I for supporting Lady Jane Grey
Lady Jane Grey – Queen of England 10–19 July 1553 and Heir to the English and Irish Thrones 21 June – 10 July 1553 (1554) – executed at Tower Green by Mary I as claimant to throne
Lord Guilford Dudley – son of John Dudley, 1st Duke of Northumberland and Royal Consort of England 10–19 July 1553 (1554) – executed at Tower Hill by order of Mary I for supporting Lady Jane Grey
Henry Grey, 1st Duke of Suffolk, KG – father of the above, Lord Lieutenant of Leicestershire, Justice in Eyre (1554) – executed at Tower Hill by order of Mary I for rebellion
Sir Thomas Wyatt the Younger (1554) – executed at Tower Hill by order of Mary I for rebellion
Thomas Howard, 4th Duke of Norfolk, KG – Earl Marshal (1573) – executed at Tower Hill by order of Elizabeth I of England for Ridolfi plot
Thomas Percy, 7th Earl of Northumberland (1572) – executed at York during the reign of Elizabeth I of England for taking part in the Rising of the North
Sir Thomas Doughty (1578) – executed by order of Sir Francis Drake
Edward Arden (1583) – executed at Tyburn during the reign of Elizabeth I of England for high treason (hanged, drawn and quartered)
Sir Francis Throckmorton (1584) – executed during the reign of Elizabeth I of England
Mary, Queen of Scots – Queen of Scots and Queen consort of France (1587) – Executed during the reign of Elizabeth I of England for treason
Robert Devereux, 2nd Earl of Essex, KG – Master of the Horse, Earl Marshal, Lord Lieutenant of Ireland, Custos Rotulorum of Pembrokeshire, Custos Rotulorum of Staffordshire, Master-General of the Ordnance (1601) – executed at Tower Hill during the reign of Elizabeth I of England for High Treason
Sir Christopher Blount (1601) – executed at Tower Hill during the reign of Elizabeth I of England for High Treason
Sir Charles Danvers (1601) – executed at Tower Hill during the reign of Elizabeth I of England for High Treason
Sir Walter Raleigh – Lord Warden of the Stannaries, Lord Lieutenant of Cornwall, Vice-Admiral of Devon, Captain of the Yeomen of the Guard, Governor of Jersey (1618) – executed in the Old Palace Yard, Westminster by orders of James VI
Mervyn Touchet, 2nd Earl of Castlehaven – executed at Tower Hill for aiding buggery (1631)
Thomas Wentworth, 1st Earl of Strafford, KG – Custos Rotulorum of the West Riding of Yorkshire, Lord Lieutenant of Yorkshire, Lord Deputy of Ireland, Lord Lieutenant of Ireland (1641) – executed at Tower Hill on orders of Parliament
Sir Alexander Carew, 2nd Baronet (1644) – executed at Tower Hill for treason on orders of Parliament
Archbishop William Laud – Archbishop of Canterbury (1645) – executed at Tower Hill on orders of Parliament
Sir John Hotham the Younger (2 January 1645) – executed at Tower Hill on orders of Parliament for betraying the parliamentarians to the Royalists
Sir John Hotham, 1st Baronet the Elder, of Scarborough (died 3 January 1645) – father of above – executed for betraying the parliamentarians to the Royalists
Charles I of England and Scotland (1649) – executed in Whitehall, London by order of Cromwell's Parliament
James Hamilton, 1st Duke of Hamilton, KG – Master of the Horse, Lord Chancellor of Scotland (1649) – executed by order of Cromwell's Parliament for being a Royalist
Arthur Capell, 1st Baron Capell of Hadham (1649) – executed by order of Cromwell's Parliament for being a Royalist
Henry Rich, 1st Earl of Holland, KG – Master of the Horse, Captain of the Yeomen of the Guard, Lord Lieutenant of Berkshire, Lord Lieutenant of Middlesex, Justice in Eyre (1649) – executed in London by order of Cromwell's Parliament for being a Royalist
Sir Henry Hyde (1650) – beheaded in London by order of Cromwell's Parliament for being a Royalist
Eusebius Andrews (1650) – beheaded on Tower Hill for treason as a Royalist.
James Stanley, 7th Earl of Derby, KG – Lord Lieutenant of Cheshire, Lancashire, Vice-Admiral of Cheshire (1651) – executed at Bolton by order of Cromwell's Parliament for being a Royalist
John Gerard (1654) – beheaded on Tower Hill for plotting against Oliver Cromwell 
Sir John Penruddock (1619–1655) – executed at Exeter by order of Cromwell's Parliament for being a Royalist
Sir Henry Slingsby, 1st Baronet (1658) – beheaded on Tower Hill, London by order of Cromwell's Parliament for being a Royalist
Reverend Dr. John Huett (1658) – beheaded on Tower Hill, London by order of Cromwell's Parliament for being a Royalist
Gregory Clement (1660) (MP) – hanged, drawn and quartered at Charing Cross by Charles II as a regicide
Oliver Cromwell (1661) – posthumously beheaded at Tyburn by order of Charles II as a regicide.
Henry Ireton (1661) – posthumously beheaded at Tyburn by order of Charles II as a regicide.
John Bradshaw (1661) – posthumously beheaded at Tyburn by order of Charles II as a regicide.
Sir Henry Vane the Younger (1662) – executed at Tower Hill by order of Charles II for the death of his father Charles I
John Twyn (1663) – hanged, drawn, quartered and beheaded (and head displayed on a Ludgate spike) for publishing an anonymous pamphlet justifying the right of rebellion against the king
William Howard, 1st Viscount Stafford (1680) – executed at Tower Hill for treason
 Saint Oliver Plunkett (1681) – hanged, drawn and quartered in London for treason
William Russell, Lord Russell – Member of Parliament for Tavistock and Tavistock (1683) – executed for being involved with the Rye House Plot
Algernon Sidney (1683) – executed at Tower Hill for being involved with the Rye House Plot
Sir Thomas Armstrong – Member of Parliament for Stafford (1684) – executed by order of Judge Jeffreys for supporting Monmouth
James Scott, 1st Duke of Monmouth (1685) – executed at Tower Hill in reign of James II after the Battle of Sedgemoor for treason
Lady Alice Lisle (1685) – executed at Winchester by Judge Jeffreys during the Bloody Assizes for harbouring Monmouth rebels
Sir John Fenwick (1697) – Jacobite Rebel executed at Tower Hill in reign of William III for treason

European New World colonies

Bolivia
Manuel Ascencio Padilla (1816) – executed for insurrection after the Battle of La Laguna

Brazil
 Joaquim José da Silva Xavier (Tiradentes) (1792) – the body was quartered after his hanging for revolutionary activity

British North America
Wingina (1586) – Roanoke Indian chief executed by first English settlers in the New World
Wituwamat (1623) – Neponset warrior killed and beheaded by the Plymouth Colony Pilgrim/soldier Miles Standish
Metacomet (1676) – New England Wampanoag chief "King Philip" executed for resisting white settlement
Blackbeard (1718) –  famous pirate beheaded after capture at Ocracoke Island

Haiti
Dutty Boukman (1791) – executed by the French for promoting a slave rebellion

Mexico
Miguel Hidalgo y Costilla and Ignacio Allende (1811) – Mexican insurgents were beheaded after their execution by firing squad

Panama
Vasco Núñez de Balboa (1519) – Spanish conquistador who discovered the Pacific Ocean. Executed by rivals Francisco Pizarro and Pedro Arias de Avila

Peru
Diego de Almagro (1538) – executed in Cuzco by his rival Francisco Pizarro
Blasco Núñez Vela (1546) - Peru's first viceroy; killed in battle with Gonzalo Pizarro, then decapitated, near Quito
Gonzalo Pizarro (1548) – executed in Peru by Pedro de la Gasca for rebellion

Finland
Tahvo Putkonen (1825) – beheaded for murder; this was the last legal beheading in Finland.

France

Ancien Régime
Olivier III de Clisson (1343) – executed by Philip VI of France for treason
Jean de Montaigu (1409) – executed in Paris by Charles VI of France
Gabriel de Lorges, Comte de Montgomery (1574) – executed by Catherine de' Medici for treason
Henri de Talleyrand-Périgord, comte de Chalais (1626) – executed in Nantes for conspiracy against Cardinal Richelieu
François-Jean de la Barre (1766) – beheaded and burnt in Abbeville for blasphemy
Nicolas Jacques Pelletier (1792) - highwayman convicted of murder. First person to be guillotined.

French Revolution

Note: some estimates place the number of persons executed by the guillotine, particularly during the Reign of Terror (1793–1794), at 40,000.

Jacques Cazotte (1792) – guillotined for treason
Arnaud II de La Porte (23 August 1792) – second political victim of the guillotine
François III Maximilien de la Woestyne, 3rd Marquess of Becelaere
Louis XVI of France (21 January 1793) - guillotined
Marie Antoinette (16 October 1793) - guillotined for treason
Charles-Louis Antiboul (1793) - guillotined as a Girondist
Jean Sylvain Bailly (1793) - Mayor of Paris. Guillotined
Madame du Barry (8 December 1793) - guillotined for treason
Jean-Baptiste Boyer-Fonfrède (1793) - guillotined as a Girondist
Jacques Pierre Brissot (1793) - guillotined as a Girondist for sedition
Charlotte Corday (1793) – guillotined for the murder of Jean-Paul Marat
Jean-François Ducos (1793) - guillotined as a Girondist
Claude Fauchet (1793) - guillotined as a Girondist
Armand Gensonné (1793) - guillotined as a Girondist
Olympe de Gouges (1793) – guillotined for sedition
Armand de Kersaint (1793) - guillotined as a Girondist
Marc David Alba Lasource (1793) – guillotined as a Girondist
Madame Roland (1793) – guillotined as a Girondist
Jean-Paul Rabaut Saint-Étienne (1793) - guillotined as a Girondist
Pierre Victurnien Vergniaud (1793) - guillotined as a Girondist
Henri Admirat (1794) - guillotined for attempted assassination of Jean-Marie Collot d'Herbois
Eustache Charles d'Aoust (1794) - Army officer. Guillotined in Paris.
Jean-François Autié (1794) - Queen's hairdresser. Guillotined 
Charles Jean Marie Barbaroux (1794) - guillotined as Girondist
Alexandre de Beauharnais (1794) – husband of Josephine (who remarried Napoleon); guillotined
Jean-Baptiste Carrier (1794) - guillotined for war crimes in the Vendée
François Chabot (1794) - guillotined for corruption in office
Pierre Gaspard Chaumette (1794) - guillotined as an Hébertist
André Chénier (1794) – poet, guillotined on trumped-up charges
Thérèse de Choiseul-Stainville (1794) – guillotined
Anacharsis Cloots (1794) - guillotined as an Hébertist
Georges Couthon (1794) – guillotined by order of the Committee of General Security
Georges Danton (1794) - guillotined for corruption
Camille Desmoulins (1794) – guillotined for plotting against Robespierre
General Arthur Dillon (1794) – guillotined in Paris for conspiracy
Pierre-Ulric Dubuisson (1794) - guillotined as an Hébertist
Jean-Jacques Duval d'Eprémesnil (1794) - guillotined in Paris for support of the Monarchy
Fabre d'Églantine (1794) - guillotined for fraud
Madame Élisabeth (1794)
Marguerite-Élie Guadet (1794) - guillotined as a Girondist
Jean-Baptiste-Joseph Gobel (1794) - guillotined as an Hébertist 
François Hanriot (1794) - guillotined with Robespierre
Jacques Hébert (1794) – Leader of Hébertist faction. Guillotined for sedition
Marie Marguerite Françoise Hébert (1794) - wife of Jacques Hébert, guillotined as Hébertist
Antoine Lavoisier (1794) – the "Father of Modern Chemistry"; guillotined for treason
Joseph Le Bon (1794) - guillotined for abuse of power
Antoine-François Momoro (1794) - guillotined as an Hébertist
Philippe de Noailles (1794) - guillotined in Paris
Anne de Noailles (1794) - guillotined in Paris
Pierre Philippeaux (1794) – guillotined for plotting against Robespierre
Maximilien Robespierre (28 July 1794) – guillotined by order of the Committee of General Security
Charles-Philippe Ronsin (1794) - guillotined as an Hébertist
Louis Antoine de Saint-Just (1794) – guillotined by order of the Committee of General Security
Marie Jean Hérault de Séchelles (1794) – guillotined for plotting against Robespierre
Jacques Guillaume Thouret (1794) - guillotined as a Girondist
François-Nicolas Vincent (1794) - guillotined as an Hébertist
François Joseph Westermann (1794) – guillotined for plotting against Robespierre

French First Republic
(after Reign of Terror)
Antoine Quentin Fouquier-Tinville (1795) – guillotined for abuse of his post as Public Prosecutor
François-Noël Babeuf (1797) - guillotined at Vendôme for involvement in Conspiracy of Equals
Augustin Alexandre Darthé (1797) - guillotined at Vendôme for involvement in Conspiracy of Equals
Giuseppe Ceracchi (1801) – guillotined by Napoleon for his role in the Conspiration des poignards

Restoration
Four Sergeants of La Rochelle (1822) – executed for treason against Louis XVIII of France
Giuseppe Marco Fieschi (1836) – executed by guillotine for killing 18 people during an attempt to assassinate King Louis-Philippe

French Republic
Prado (1888) – Guillotined at La Rocquette, Paris for murder
 François Claudius Koenigstein, known as Ravachol (1892) – guillotined for murder and anarchy
Sante Geronimo Caserio (1894) – executed for assassination of president Marie François Sadi Carnot
Téophile Deroo, the "Pollet Band" (1909) – guillotined in Béthune (Nord-Pas-de-Calais), by Anatole Deibler, for a series of murders
Canut Vromant, the "Pollet Band" (1909) – guillotined in Béthune (Nord-Pas-de-Calais), by Anatole Deibler, for a series of murders
Auguste Pollet, the "Pollet Band" (1909) – guillotined in Béthune (Nord-Pas-de-Calais), by Anatole Deibler, for a series of murders
Abel Pollet, the "Pollet Band" (1909) – guillotined in Béthune (Nord-Pas-de-Calais), by Anatole Deibler, for a series of murders
Henri Landru (1922) – executed for serial murder
Paul Gorguloff (1932) – executed in Paris for assassination of President Paul Doumer
Eugen Weidmann (1939) – executed for murder; last public execution by guillotine in France
Jacques Fesch (1957) – executed in Paris for killing a policeman
Christian Ranucci (1976) – guillotined in Marseille for murder
Jérôme Carrein (1977) – guillotined in Douai for murder
Hamida Djandoubi (1977) – guillotined in Marseille for murder – last execution in France, last execution in Western world to be carried out by beheading, and last execution by guillotine anywhere in the world
Hervé Cornara (2015) – murder linked to terrorism in Lyon by Yassin Salhi in the Saint-Quentin-Fallavier attack
Samuel Paty (2020) – teacher decapitated after he was falsely accused of showing a Charlie Hebdo caricature of the Prophet Muhammad during a lesson.

Georgia
Demetre II (1289) – executed by the Mongol Arghun Khan for rebellion

Germany

Pre-20th century

Priscillian (385) – beheaded for heresy at Trier
Johann Wittenborg (1363) – beheaded in Lübeck for dereliction of duty after naval defeat by Denmark.
Klaus Störtebeker (1400) – beheaded for piracy against the Hanseatic League in Hamburg
Thomas Müntzer (1525) – beheaded after the Battle of Frankenhausen during German Peasants' War
Ludwig Haetzer (1529) – executed in Konstanz for Anabaptist radicalism (but technically for adultery)
Thomas von Imbroich (1558) – beheaded for heresy in Cologne
Johann Philipp Kratz von Scharffenstein (1635) – beheaded for treason in Vienna after defecting to the Swedish Empire during the Thirty Years' War
Hans Ulrich von Schaffgotsch (1635) – beheaded for treason in Regensburg
Hans Hermann von Katte (1730) – beheaded in Küstrin for helping Crown Prince Frederick of Prussia in an attempt to flee to Great Britain
Schinderhannes (1803) – guillotined in Mainz for armed robbery and other crimes
Karl Ludwig Sand (1820) – beheaded for the murder of August von Kotzebue in Mannheim
Max Hödel (1878) – executed for attempting to assassinate Emperor Wilhelm I

Weimar Republic
 Rupert Fischer (1924) – Murderer; first to be guillotined by Johann Reichhart who executed 3165 condemned

Fritz Haarmann (1925) – The Butcher (or Vampire) of Hanover; guillotined in Hanover for murder
Peter Kürten (1931) – The Vampire of Düsseldorf; guillotined in Cologne for murder

Nazi Germany
Bruno Tesch (1933) – executed in Altona with three others after "Altona Bloody Sunday"
Marinus van der Lubbe (1934) – guillotined in Leipzig for starting the Reichstag fire
Benita von Falkenhayn and Renate von Natzmer (1935) – executed by axe in Berlin for espionage for Poland
Edgar Josef André (1936) – beheaded in Hamburg for treasonous involvement in the Reichstag Fire
Helmut Hirsch (1937) – executed in Berlin for treason
Lilo Herrmann (1938) – guillotined in Berlin for treason
Wilhelm Kusserow (1940) – Jehovah's Witness beheaded for refusing to serve in German military service
Maurice Bavaud (1941) – guillotined in Berlin for attempting to assassinate Hitler
Helmuth Hübener (1942) – guillotined in Berlin for treason
Ilse Stöbe (1942) – guillotined in Berlin for treason via Red Orchestra
Wolfgang Kusserow (1942) – Jehovah's Witness beheaded for refusing to serve in German military service
Franz Jägerstätter (1943) – guillotined in Berlin as a conscientious objector
Maria Restituta (1943) – guillotined for treason
Cato Bontjes van Beek (1943) – guillotined in Berlin for conspiracy to commit treason
Mildred Harnack (1943) – American born; guillotined in Berlin for anti-Nazi activity via Red Orchestra
Sophie Scholl (1943) – guillotined for treason via White Rose resistance group
Hans Scholl (1943) – brother of above – guillotined for treason via White Rose resistance group
Christoph Probst (1943) – guillotined for treason via White Rose resistance group
Willi Graf (1943) – guillotined for treason via White Rose resistance group
Alex Schmorell (1943) – guillotined for treason via White Rose resistance group
Kurt Huber (1943) – guillotined for treason via White Rose resistance group
Otto and Elise Hampel (1943) – guillotined in Berlin for treason
Musa Cälil (1944) – guillotined in Plötzensee Prison, Berlin, for anti-Nazi activities
Werner Seelenbinder (1944) – beheaded with an axe, for being a communist
Friedrich Lorenz (1944) – beheaded by Nazi party at Halle an der Saale

Great Britain

William Gordon, 6th Viscount of Kenmure (1716) – executed at Tower Hill as a Jacobite Rebel
James Radclyffe, 3rd Earl of Derwentwater (1716) –  executed at Tower Hill as a Jacobite Rebel
Arthur Elphinstone, 6th Lord Balmerinoch (1746) – beheaded at Tower Hill as a Jacobite supporter of Prince Charles Edward Stuart, he was taken prisoner at Culloden
William Boyd, 4th Earl of Kilmarnock (1746) – beheaded at Tower Hill as a Jacobite supporter of Prince Charles Edward Stuart, he was taken prisoner at Culloden
Charles Radclyffe, titular 5th Earl of Derwentwater (1746) – executed at Tower Hill as a Jacobite Rebel
Simon Fraser, 11th Lord Lovat (1747) – executed at Tower Hill as a prominent veteran Jacobite supporter of Prince Charles Edward Stuart. Although too old to participate in the 1745 Rising, he was chosen by the British Crown for execution in lieu of his youthful son, who had actually led Clan Fraser for the Jacobite cause
Jeremiah Brandreth (1817) – hanged and beheaded in Derby for treason; followed by William Turner and Issac Ludlam, the last British decapitations by axe
Arthur Thistlewood and the four other Cato Street Conspirators (1820) – hanged and beheaded outside Newgate Prison for treason. A surgical knife was used to remove the heads.
James Wilson, Andrew Hardie, and John Baird (1820) were hanged and beheaded for treason for their involvement in the Radical War. A hatchet was used to perform the decapitation. These were the last three people to be hanged and beheaded in the United Kingdom.
Jolanta Bledaite (2008) – Lithuanian immigrant, tortured and killed in Scotland
Gerald Mellin (2008) – tied a rope around his neck and connected it to a tree before driving away in his sports car to commit suicide.
David Phyall (2008) – see List of unusual deaths
Lee Rigby (2013) - decapitated by Islamists who ran him over with a car before decapitating him.
David Cawthorne Haines (2014) — decapitated in the Syro-Arabian desert by the Islamic State of Iraq and the Levant.

Hungary
László Hunyadi (1457) – executed by Ladislaus V for plotting against him
Gurgen Margaryan (2004) - beheaded in his sleep by Azerbaijani Lieutenant Ramil Safarov during a NATO summit in Budapest. Safarov stated during both his interrogation and trial that he murdered Margaryan because he was of Armenian descent. Safarov was later pardoned upon extradition by the President of Azerbaijan, Ilham Aliyev.
János Kádár (2007) – posthumously decapitated by dig desecrater(s).

India
 Hemchandra Vikramaditya, also known as Hemu (1556) – after being wounded by Mughal army in the Second Battle of Panipat, Hemu was beheaded by Bairam Khan, a commander-in-chief of the Mughal army
Guru Tegh Bahadur (1675) – ninth guru of Sikhs executed in Delhi by order of Mughal emperor Aurangzeb
Saint John de Brito (1693) – Portuguese Jesuit missionary executed in India for preaching Christianity
Raja Dahir (711/712) – executed on command of Muhammad bin Qasim after Dahir's Kingdom of Sindh was defeated
Mourya Sawant (1912) – last Ranes was beheaded by Portuguese. Mourya Sawant was Hindu martyr who struggled against Portuguese and he also against forced conversion of the Goans to Christianity
2013 India–Pakistan border skirmishes – two Indian Army soldiers, Lance Naik Hemraj and Lance Naik Sudhakar Singh were killed and their bodies were apparently found mutilated, with one decapitated by Pakistan Army

Iraq

Ancient Mesopotamia
Teumman (653 BC), king of Elam, by the conquering Assyrian Ashubanipal at the Battle of Til-Tuba; his son Tammaritu was also beheaded

Abbasid era
 Imam Husayn ibn Ali and his 72 companions (680) – at the Battle of Karbala
Al-Walid ibn Tarif al-Shaybani, was a Kharijite rebel leader. In 794, he launched a rebellion against the Abbasid Caliphate, but was defeated, killed, and beheaded in 795.
Ja'far al-Barmaki (803) – Vizier executed on the orders Caliph Harun al-Rashid (r. 786–809).
Al-Amin the sixth Abbasid Caliph, (r. 809–813) was beheaded on 27 September 813 during the conflict.
Al-Musta'in, was the twelfth Abbasid caliph (r. 861–866), he was killed in 866 on the orders of his cousin al-Mu'tazz.

Modern
Shosei Koda (2004) – Japanese citizen beheaded by terrorists
Kim Sun-il (2004) – South Korean citizen beheaded by terrorists
Kenneth Bigley (2004) – UK citizen beheaded by terrorists
Nick Berg (2004) – US citizen beheaded by terrorists
Eugene Armstrong (2004) – US citizen beheaded by terrorists
Jack Hensley (2004) – US citizen beheaded by terrorists
Paul Marshall Johnson, Jr. (2004) – US citizen beheaded by terrorists
Barzan Ibrahim al-Tikriti (2007) – Saddam Hussein's half brother decapitated during hanging for crimes against humanity

Iceland
Jon Arason (1550) – was the last Icelandic Roman Catholic bishop and poet, who was executed in his struggle against the imposition of the Protestant Reformation in Iceland.

Iran

Buqa (1289) - Grand Vizier. Executed for treason.

Ireland
Ascall mac Ragnaill (1171) – beheaded after capture when attempting to capture Dublin.
Tigernán Ua Ruairc (1172) – beheaded on Hill of Ward, Meath during a parlay with Hugh de Lacy, Lord of Meath.
Cornelius Grogan (1798) – hanged and beheaded in Wexford for taking part in the Irish rebellion of 1798
John Henry Colclough (1798) – hanged and beheaded in Wexford for taking part in the Irish rebellion of 1798
Bagenal Beauchamp Harvey (1798) – hanged and beheaded in Wexford for taking part in the Irish rebellion of 1798
John Kelly (1798) – hanged and beheaded in Wexford for taking part in the Irish rebellion of 1798
John Murphy (priest) (1798) – hanged and beheaded in Tullow for taking part in the Irish rebellion of 1798

Israel

 Shimon ben Gamliel and Ishmael ben Elisha ha-Kohen (70) – two rabbis among the Ten Martyrs.
Bernard de Tremelay (1153) Grand Master of the Knights Templar – killed and beheaded at the Battle of Ascalon by Egyptians.
Raynald of Châtillon (1187) – executed by Saladin after the Battle of Hattin
Gerard de Ridefort (1189) Grand Master of the Knights Templar – executed by Saladin at the Battle of Acre
 2,700 Muslim prisoners (1191) – beheaded on orders of Richard I of England after the Battle of Acre.

Italy

Ancient Rome
Lucius Appuleius Saturninus (100 BC) – radical tribune; Gaius Rabirius toyed with his severed head at a dinner party
Marcus Antonius (87 BC) – grandfather of Marc Antony
Marcus Marius Gratidianus (82 BC) – praetor whose head was paraded through Rome after execution
Gaius Marcius Censorinus (Marian) (82 BC), beheaded by Sulla, his head was sent to Preneste to lower Gaius Marius the Younger's troop's morale 
Marcus Licinius Crassus (53 BC) – general, politician and richest man then in the world – beheaded posthumously after his defeat in Parthia
Publius Licinius Crassus (53 BC) – son of Marcus Licinius Crassus – beheaded posthumously in Parthia
Pompey the Great (48 BC) – general, politician and member of the First Triumvirate – assassinated and beheaded posthumously in Egypt
Gnaeus Pompeius (45 BC) – Pompey's son – executed for treason by Julius Caesar
Titus Labienus (45 BC) – general, politician and one of Julius Caesar's foremost subordinates – Killed and beheaded posthumously at the Battle of Munda
Gaius Trebonius (43 BC) – politician and general, tortured and beheaded by Publius Cornelius Dolabella; his head was kicked around like a football by Dolabella's soldiers
Cicero (43 BC) – politician, lawyer and Rome's greatest orator – executed by order of Marc Anthony
Marcus Antonius Antyllus (30 BC) – son of Marc Antony – executed by Octavian
Claudia Octavia (62) – first wife of Emperor Nero, by whom she was divorced, banished, and executed – beheaded posthumously
Galba (69) – assassinated Roman emperor
Pope Sixtus II (258) – Christian Martyr executed during the persecution of Christians ordered by Emperor Valerian
Stilicho (408) – executed in coup d'état after Gothic invasion
Anthemius (472) – Emperor, assassinated by Ricimer

Medieval Italy
Giordano d'Anglano (1267) – beheaded in Brolo, Sicily by Charles of Anjou after the Battle of Tagliacozzo
Conradin, King of Sicily (29 October 1268) – executed in Naples by Charles of Anjou
Frederick I of Baden, Margrave of Baden (29 October 1268) – executed in Naples by Charles of Anjou
Fra' Moriale (1354) – beheaded in Rome
Marino Faliero, Doge of Venice (1355) – executed for a failed coup d'état
Albert Sterz (1366) – condottiero beheaded in Perugia for treachery
Giovanni da Barbiano (1399) – condottiero beheaded in Bologna

Later Italy

Antongaleazzo Bentivoglio (1435) – beheaded in Bologna as a rebel
Gian Paolo Baglioni (1520) – beheaded in Rome for attempted assassination
Giovanni Carafa, Duke of Paliano (1561) – beheaded by order of Pope Pius IV
Pietro Carnesecchi (1567) – beheaded by the Christian inquisition for heresy
Beatrice Cenci and Lucrezia Peroni (1599) – beheaded by sword in Rome for murder of Francesco Cenci
Ferrante Pallavicino (1644) – beheaded at Avignon for blasphemy by order of Pope Urban VIII
Felice Orsini (1858) – executed by Napoléon III for attempting to assassinate him

Japan

Home islands
Ishida Mitsunari, daimyō and general (1600) – beheaded in Kyoto after the Battle of Sekigahara
Ankokuji Ekei, Buddhist monk and ally of Mitsunari (1600) – beheaded in Kyoto after the Battle of Sekigahara
Konishi Yukinaga (1600), ally of Mitsunari – beheaded in Kyoto after the Battle of Sekigahara
Asano Naganori, lord of the Forty-seven Ronin (1701) – ordered to commit seppuku (hari kiri) followed by beheading
Kondo Isami, commander of the Shinsengumi (1868) – executed at Itabashi

Japanese-occupied territories (20th century)
William Ellis Newton, VC – Royal Australian Air Force pilot beheaded in Papua New Guinea by Japanese forces
Leonard Siffleet (1943) – Australian WWII commando, captured by partisan tribesmen, tortured and beheaded in Papua New Guinea by Japanese soldiers
Stanley James Woodbridge (1945) – British Royal Air Force crewman captured and beheaded by Japanese forces in Rangoon, Burma

Modern Japan 
 Kenji Goto (2015) – journalist beheaded in Syria by Islamic State of Iraq and the Levant militants after the breakdown of negotiations for his release

Jordan
Al-Walid II was the Umayyad caliph (r. 743–744). He was killed and beheaded by his cousin Yazid III. Yazid had Walid's head hoisted "on a lance and paraded around Damascus".

Korea
 Columba Kim (1839) – beheaded for Christian religious convictions 
 Laurent-Marie-Joseph Imbert (1839) – beheaded in Saenamteo for being Christian
Kim Okgyun, Korean activist (1894) – assassinated and beheaded at sea by Hong Jong-u due to leading Gapsin Revolution

Libya
21 Coptic Egyptians (2015) — On February 15, 2015, 21 kidnapped Coptic Egyptian Christians were beheaded by ISIS Militants on a beach in Tripolitania, Libya. One of ISIS’s media wings, Al-Hayat Media Center released a five minute video of the beheadings, titled "a message signed with blood to the nation of the cross".
30 Ethiopian Christians (2015) — On April 19, 2015, 30 kidnapped Ethiopian Christians in two groups were killed by ISIS. Half of them were beheaded on a beach in Cyrenaica and the other half in a desert in Fezzan, were fatally shot by AK’s, the Christian killed by the ISIS member giving the speech was shot with a pistol. One of ISIS’s media wings, Al-Furqan Media released a thirty minute propaganda video including the killings, titled "until there came to them clear evidence".

Netherlands/Belgium

Wijerd Jelckama (1523) – executed in Leeuwarden for the Frisian rebellion
Anthony van Stralen, Lord of Merksem (1568) – beheaded by the Governor, the Duke of Alba, at Vilvoorde for treason.
Jan van Casembroot (1568) – beheaded by the Governor, the Duke of Alba, at Vilvoorde for treason.
Lamoral, Count of Egmont (1568) – beheaded in Brussels for treason.
Philip de Montmorency, Count of Horn (1568) – beheaded in Brussels for treason
Balthasar Gérard (1584) – tortured and beheaded for assassinating Willem of Orange
Johan van Oldenbarnevelt (1619) – executed in the Hague for Hollandic separatism by Prince Maurice
Emile Ferfaille (1918) guillotined in Furnes for murder – last guillotine execution
 Nabil Amzieb (2016) – beheaded in Amsterdam by a Moroccan gang for conflicts in underground drug-war

Norway
Ole Nypan (1670) - executed for witchcraft. 
Anders Olson Lysne (1803) - executed for lèse-majesté.
Peter Westerstrøm (1809) - executed for mass murder.
Aslak Hætta (1854) - executed for murder.
Mons Somby (1854) - executed for murder.
Kristoffer Nilsen Svartbækken Grindalen (1876) - executed for murder and robbery, the last public execution in Norway.

Pakistan
Arab Sind Province of Caliphate
Raja Dahir (712) – executed on command of Muhammad bin Qasim after Dahir's empire was defeated.

United Provinces of Agra and Oudh
Syed Ahmad Barelvi (1831) – Sufi mujahideen who was beheaded by Indian army in the battle of balakot

Islamic Republic of Pakistan
Daniel Pearl (2002) – American journalist killed by al-Qaeda.
Piotr Stańczak (February 2009) – Polish engineer beheaded in Pakistan by Radical Islamic terrorists

Philippines
The following were all executed by ISIL-inspired terrorist group Abu Sayyaf.
Bernard Then (2015) – Malaysian man who was kidnapped from a restaurant in Sandakan, Malaysia, brought over to Parang, Sulu, and beheaded after ransom demands were not met
Robert Hall (2016) – Canadian welder held for ransom, after the resort he was staying at was raided by Abu Sayyaf militants. They demanded 300 million pesos (around $6.5 million) for his release, and when the demand was not met, Hall was beheaded nine months later in Patikul, Sulu
John Ridsdel (2016) – Canadian businessman, also held for ransom at the same resort as Robert Hall. Ridsdel was beheaded on 25 April 2016, nine months after being held hostage
Jürgen Kantner (2017) – German sailor ambushed and held for ransom, while out sailing with his wife, who was shot and killed. Abu Sayyaf militants demanded 30 million pesos ($600,000), and when the demand was not met, Kantner was beheaded

Poland
 Kazimierz Łyszczyński (1689) – executed in Warsaw by Christians for being atheist
Rozalia Lubomirska (1794) - guillotined during French Revolution

Russia
 Yuri II of Vladimir (1238) – beheaded after losing the Battle of the Sit River
 Philipp Schall von Bell (1560) – executed in captivity by order of Ivan the Terrible.
 Stenka Razin (1671) – quartered alive in Moscow for Cossack revolution
 Ivan Andreyevich Khovansky (Tararui) (1682) – beheaded for involvement in the Moscow uprising of 1682
 Ivan Tsykler (1697) – quartered on charges of conspiracy against Peter the Great
 Mary Hamilton (lady in waiting) (1719) – executed for infanticide and slandering Catherine I of Russia
 Yemelyan Pugachev (1775) – quartered in Moscow for insurrection by Catherine II of Russia
 Yevgeny Rodionov (1996) – beheaded by Chechen militants

Saudi Arabia
Prince Faisal bin Musa'id (1975) – for the assassination of his uncle, King Faisal
Paul Marshall Johnson, Jr. (2004) – American engineer killed by Al-Qaeda on the Arabian Peninsula
Rizana Nafeek (2013) – Sri Lankan woman for homicide

Scotland

Donnchadh, Earl of Lennox (1425) – executed by orders of James I of Scotland
Lord Walter Stewart and Lord Alexander Sewart (1425) – executed by orders of James I of Scotland
Murdoch Stewart, Duke of Albany (1425) – executed by order of James I of Scotland
Walter Stewart, 1st Earl of Atholl (1437) – executed for his part in the murder of James I of Scotland
William Douglas, 6th Earl of Douglas (1440) – executed at Edinburgh Castle on trumped-up charges in front of James II of Scotland
Lord David Douglas (1440) – executed at Edinburgh Castle on trumped-up charges in front of James II of Scotland
Hugh Douglas, Earl of Ormonde (1455) – executed on the orders of James II of Scotland
John Douglas, Lord of Balvenie (1463) – executed on the orders of James III of Scotland
Sir James Hamilton of Finnart – Master of Work to the Crown of Scotland (1540) – executed by order of James V of Scotland
James Douglas, 4th Earl of Morton (1581) – executed on the Scottish maiden for complicity in murder of Lord Darnley
William Ruthven, 1st Earl of Gowrie (1584) – executed by order of James VI of Scotland
John Maxwell, 9th Lord Maxwell (1613) – beheaded in Edinburgh for carrying out a revenge killing
Patrick Stewart, 2nd Earl of Orkney (1615) – executed by order of James VI of Scotland
Sir John Gordon, 1st Baronet, of Haddo (1644) – executed on the Scottish maiden by the Covenanters for treason as a Royalist
Archibald Campbell, 1st Marquess of Argyll (1661) – executed by order of Charles II of Scotland on the Scottish maiden for treason
Mrs Hamilton (1679) – beheaded for the murder of James Baillie, 2nd Lord Forrester
Archibald Campbell, 9th Earl of Argyll (1685) – son of above; executed by order of James VII of Scotland on the Scottish maiden for treason
Godfrey McCulloch (1697) – executed on the Scottish maiden for murder; last man to be executed by the maiden

Serbia
Prince Lazar Hrebeljanović (1389) – executed during the Battle of Kosovo by order of Bayezid I.
Miloš Obilić (1389) – probably decapitated by order of Bayezid I after assassinating Murad I.
Aleksa Nenadović (1804) – executed in Valjevo during the Slaughter of the Knezes.
Ilija Birčanin (1804) – executed in Valjevo during the Slaughter of the Knezes.
Karađorđe (1817) – Assassinated by order of his groomsman, Miloš Obrenović. The cause of death itself was a substantial chest injuries caused by an axe, however, his body was immediately decapitated.

Spain
 Eulogius of Cordova (859) – executed by Muslim rulers of Córdoba for blasphemy
 Lope Fortuñónez de Albero (1135) – executed by King of Aragon, Ramiro II, for treason
 Fortún Galíndez de Huesca (1135) – executed by King of Aragon, Ramiro II, for treason
 Martín Galíndez de Ayerbe (1135) – executed by King of Aragon, Ramiro II, for treason
 Bertrán de Ejea (1135) – executed by King of Aragon, Ramiro II, for treason
 Miguel de Rada de Perarrúa (1135) – executed by King of Aragon, Ramiro II, for treason
 Íñigo López de Naval (1135) – executed by King of Aragon, Ramiro II, for treason
 Cecodín de Ruesta (1135) – executed by King of Aragon, Ramiro II, for treason
 Muhammed VI (1362) – beheaded by Peter I of Castille with restored Muhammad V as Sultan of Granada.
 Juan Bravo (1521) – executed in Villalar de los Comuneros, Valladolid
 Juan de Padilla (1521) – executed in Villalar de los Comuneros, Valladolid
 Francisco Maldonado (1521) – executed in Villalar de los Comuneros, Valladolid
 Antonio Osorio de Acuña (1526) – executed in Simancas for supporting the Comunero Revolt
 Juan de Lanuza y Urrea (1591) – "Justicia de Aragón", beheaded by personal order of Felipe II on 20 December 1591, 89 days after swearing in his appointment.
 Rodrigo Calderon (1621) – executed in Madrid
 Eduardo Montori Sanz (1996) – beheaded in Ejea de los Caballeros
 Jennifer Mills-Westley (2011) – beheaded in a supermarket in Los Cristianos, Tenerife.

Sri Lanka
 Puviraja Pandaram (1591) – Hindu king who was beheaded by Portuguese. Portuguese, led by André Furtado as commander, mounted a military campaign against the Jaffna kingdom from Mannar and succeed for conquer Jaffna kingdom.
 Keppetipola Disawe (1818) – beheaded by British Ceylon in Kandy, Sri Lanka for fighting for independence.

Sweden

  (1520) – Bishop of Strängnäs; first of about 100 to be executed by Danes in the Stockholm Bloodbath
  (1520) – Bishop of Skara; executed by Danes in the Stockholm Bloodbath
  (1520) – Swedish nobleman; one of 15 noblemen executed by Danes in the Stockholm Bloodbath
 Grigory Kotoshikhin (1667) – Russian defected diplomat; executed in Stockholm for the murder of a homeowner under the influence of alcohol.
 Anna Zippel (1676) – executed in Stockholm for witchcraft
 Brita Zippel (1676) – sister of above; executed in Stockholm for witchcraft
 Johan Johansson Griis (1676) – witness in the trial against the above sisters; executed for perjury
 Anna Eriksdotter (1704) – beheaded for sorcery.
 Jacob Johan Anckarström (1792) – executed for assassination of Gustav III
 Metta Fock (1810) – executed for murder of her husband and children
 Anna Månsdotter (1890) – executed by axe for murder; last woman executed in Sweden
 John Filip Nordlund (1900) – executed by axe in Västerås for mass murder
 Johan Alfred Ander (1910) – executed by guillotine in Stockholm for murder; last Swedish execution

Syria
James Foley (2014) — American journalist beheaded in Raqqa, Syria by the Islamic State of Iraq and the Levant, specifically Mohammed Emwazi, in retaliation for American airstrikes in Iraq. His execution was filmed, in a beheading video titled "A Message to America".
Steven Sotloff (2014) — beheaded in the Syro-Arabian desert by the Islamic State of Iraq and the Levant, one month after the beheading of James Foley. His execution was filmed, and released with the title "A Second Message to America".

Switzerland

Wildhans von Breitenlandenberg and 61 companions (1444) – executed following the siege of Greifensee during the Old Zürich War
Anna Göldi (1782) – executed as the "last witch in Switzerland"

Turkey

Byzantine era

 Phocas (610) – Emperor overthrown and beheaded by Heraclius
 Leontios (706)
 Tiberius III (706)
 Justinian II (711)

Ottoman era
Bajo Pivljanin (1685) – Serb hajduk in Venetian service, beheaded and head sent to Sultan Mehmed IV
Abdullah bin Saud (1818) – last ruler of the First Saudi State and was beheaded by the Ottomans
Ali Pasha of Yanina (1822) – shot and beheaded by order of Sultan Mahmud II

United States

Henry Laurens (1792) – decapitated posthumously in accordance with his wishes and then burned on a funeral pyre by his son and slaves
Isaac N. Ebey (1857) – Washington state pioneer murdered by Haida Indians
Pearl Bryan (1896) – murdered in Fort Thomas, Kentucky
Captain Harry Miller (1936) – beheaded after murder near New Trenton, Indiana, "Head and Hands" murder
Sixteen victims of Jeffrey Dahmer (1978–1991)
Christa Hoyt (1990) – decapitated by serial killer Danny Rolling
Frank Griga and Krisztina Furton (1995) – decapitated and dismembered by Daniel Lugo and Adrian Doorbal members of the infamous Sun Gym gang in Miami
Yang Xin (2009) - decapitated at Virginia Tech by Zhu Haiyang
Aasiya Zubair (2009) – decapitated in New York by murderer/husband Muzzammil Hassan
Hanny Tawadros and Amgad Konds (2013) – decapitated posthumously, allegedly by murderer Yusef Ibrahim
Colleen Hufford (2014) – 54-year-old woman was decapitated in Oklahoma by a 30-year-old pro-Jihad, Islamist, Jah'Keem Yisrael, formerly Alton Alexander Nolen.
Lee Manuel Viloria-Paulino (2016) – missing youth who was found to have been decapitated by a classmate
Jennifer Schlecht (2019) – decapitated by her husband in their Harlem flat, he then killed their daughter and hung himself on a fan. Yonathan Tedla (the husband) put Jennifer Schlecht's head in her lap.
Cecilia Gibson (2020) – 79-year-old Cecilia Gibson, step-grandmother of her killer, Kenny W. McBride, 45, was bludgeoned in head while in house, then McBride decapitated and placed Ms. Gibson's head in their back yard. Kenny W. McBride was arrested at time of reporting after body was dead for two days. McBride's father had married and his new wife's mother, Cecilia Gibson, all lived in the same residence in Bedford, Michigan where the crime occurred.

Vietnam

 Vicente Liem de la Paz (1773) – beheaded in Tonkin as Christian martyr
 Pierre Dumoulin-Borie (1838) – beheaded in Tonkin as Christian martyr
 Bernard Võ Văn Duệ (1838) – beheaded in Korea as Christian martyr
 Andrew Dũng-Lạc (1839) – beheaded in Korea as Christian martyr
 Augustin Schoeffler (1851) – beheaded in Tonkin as Christian martyr
 Jean-Louis Bonnard (1852) – beheaded in Korea as Christian martyr
 Michael Hồ Đình Hy (1857) – beheaded in Korea as Christian martyr
 Théophane Vénard (1861) – beheaded in Tonkin as Christian martyr
 Ba Cụt (Lê Quang Vinh) (1956) – guillotined in Cần Thơ for insurrection and multiple murder

Wales

Gwenllian ferch Gruffudd (February 1136) – executed by the Anglo-Norman forces led by Maurice de Londres at Kidwelly Castle, Wales, after a failed uprising
Llewelyn ap Gruffydd (1282) – beheaded posthumously after his death in battle at Aberedw
Sir Gruffudd Vychan (1447) – executed at Powis Castle by Lord Powis for unclear reasons
Sir Roger Vaughan (1471) – beheaded at Chepstow by Jasper Tudor, Earl of Bedford for being a Yorkist

Religious figures

The Bible

Hebrew Bible/Old Testament
Goliath – after he was killed by David, this example illustrates the aforementioned post-mortem decapitation
Saul - after he fell on his sword at the Battle of Mount Gilboa; the Philistines cut off his head and fastened his body to the wall of Beth-shan.
Sheba son of Bichri – killed by the people of Abel-beth-maachah to stop the soldiers of David pursuing him from destroying the city

Apocrypha
Holofernes in the deuterocanonical Book of Judith

New Testament

John the Baptist (c. 30 AD) - in the Gospels by order of Herod Antipas
Theudas (c. 46 AD) - Jewish rebel mentioned in the Book of Acts; severed head displayed in Jerusalem.

Catholic saints

Saint Acisclus, according to local tradition
Saint Agnes, according to legend mentioned by the fourth century Saint Ambrose
Saint Alban (around 304) – executed in Roman Britain for converting to Christianity, according to tradition
Saint Andrew Kim (1846) – beheaded in Korea for being Christian
Saint Ansanus, according to legend
Saint Anthimus of Rome, according to legend
Saint Barbara, according to legend
Saint Catherine of Alexandria, according to tradition
Saint Christopher, according to legend
Saint Columba of Spain, according to local tradition
Saint Columba of France, according to legend
Saint Columba (the Virgin) of Cornwall, England, according to legend
Saints Cosmas and Damian (c.287) – executed in purge of Christians in Syria, according to tradition
Saint Cyprian (13 September 258) – Bishop of Carthage, North Africa – Christian Martyr executed in the persecution ordered by Emperor Valerian
Saint Denis, according to legend, which states that he carried his head to his final resting place, a familiar hagiographical trope (see Cephalophore)
Saint Diomedes, according to legend
Saint Dorothea of Alexandria, according to legend
Saint Dymphna, according to tradition
Saint Emmeram, according to legend
Saint Eurosia, according to tradition
Saint Felicitas of Rome, according to legend
Saints Felix and Nabor, according to tradition
Saints Firmus and Rusticus, according to tradition
Saint George, according to legend
Saint Gereon, according to legend
Saint Gordianus, according to tradition
Saint James, according to the Acts of the Apostles
Saint Marcellus, according to tradition
Saint Maximilian of Tebessa (295) – executed by Romans for conscientious objection to military service, according to tradition
Saint Nicasius of Rheims, at Rheims (407) – executed by Vandals during conquest of Rheims, according to tradition
Saint Pancras, according to legend
Apostle Paul, traditionally
Saint Peter of Rates, according to tradition
Saint Polyeuctus, according to tradition
Saint Quiteria, according to legend
Saints Rufina and Secunda, according to legend
Saints Simplicius and Faustinus, according to legend
Saint Solange, according to legend
Saint Typasius, according to legend
Saint Urith of Chittlehampton, Devon, England, according to legend
Saint Venantius, at Camerino, according to tradition
Saint Winefride of Flintshire in Wales, according to legend
Saint Demiana, according to tradition

Greek mythology

Medusa, a Gorgon beheaded by Perseus
Argus Panoptes, beheaded by Mercury in order to rescue Io

Sikh
 Guru Tegh Bahadur (1675) – for refusing to convert to Islam
 Baba Deep Singh (1757) – in the Battle of Amritsar
 1000 Sikhs (1746) – executed by Zakariya Khan Bahadur in Lahore

Hindu
Karna – in the epic war of Mahabharata
Drona – in the epic war of Mahabharata
Rakthabeeja – by goddess Kali to eradicate the evil from the earth
Jayadratha – in the epic war of Mahabharata

Fictional characters

See also
 List of prisoners of the Tower of London
 Maiden (guillotine), also known as "The Maiden" or "The Scottish Maiden"
 Tower Hill

References

beheaded